Summer pudding or summer fruit pudding is a British dessert made of sliced white bread, layered in a deep bowl with fruit and fruit juice. It is left to soak overnight and turned out onto a plate. The dessert was most popular from the late 19th to the early 20th century. It first appears in print with its current name in 1904, but identical recipes for 'hydropathic pudding' and 'Malvern pudding' from as far back as 1868 have been found.

Making summer pudding is much easier if the bread is somewhat stale. This helps the fruit juices soak through the bread, which makes the pudding more pleasant. Summer pudding can be served with cream.

The fruits typically used in summer pudding are raspberries, strawberries, blackcurrants, redcurrants, whitecurrants, and blackberries. Less commonly used are
tayberries, loganberries, cherries and blueberries.

See also

 List of fruit dishes

References

External links

 

British puddings
English cuisine
Fruit dishes